Dubovac is a village in Serbia. It is situated in the Kovin municipality, in the South Banat District, Vojvodina province. The village has a Serb ethnic majority (84.02%) and its population numbering 1,283 people (2002 census).

Name

In Serbian, the village is known as Дубовац or Dubovac, in Hungarian as Dunadombó, in German as Dubowatz, in Croatian as Dubovac.

History

The old village known as Stari Dubovac (Old Dubovac) was situated closer to the Danube river.

Population

References

Jovan Erdeljanović, Srbi u Banatu, Novi Sad, 1992.
Slobodan Ćurčić, Broj stanovnika Vojvodine, Novi Sad, 1996.

See also
List of places in Serbia
List of cities, towns and villages in Vojvodina

Populated places in Serbian Banat
Populated places in South Banat District
Kovin